Charles H. Lipson (born February 1, 1948) is an American political scientist who is professor emeritus of political science at the University of Chicago.  His areas of specialization include international relations, international political economy and modern international history.

Education
Born and raised in Marks, Mississippi, Lipson attended Yale as an undergraduate, where he studied Political Science and Economics. He received a Master of Arts degree and a doctoral degree from Harvard University.

While studying at Harvard, Lipson won the Chase Prize for the best essay on a subject relating to the promotion of world peace.

Career
Charles Lipson has taught at the University of Chicago since 1977.  His research focuses on international cooperation and conflict and political aspects of international trade, debt, and investment. In addition to his political science publications, Lipson writes books on academic integrity, adjusting to college and doing research that are broadly applicable to students of all academic interests.

Lipson is the co-founder and director of the Program on International Politics, Economics, and Security (PIPES), a weekly workshop for graduate students to discuss research issues in international politics.

In 1991, he served as the Secretary of the American Political Science Association

Publications

Books

In the book, Reliable Partners: How Democracies Have Made a Separate Peace (2003), Lipson examines "why democracies do not fight wars against each other."

Lipson has also edited several books on international politics:

 Rational Design of International Institutions, ed. by Barbara Koremenos, Charles Lipson, and Duncan Snidal (Cambridge: Cambridge University Press, 2004).
 Theory and Structure in International Political Economy: An International Organization Reader, ed. by Charles Lipson and Benjamin J. Cohen (Cambridge, MA: MIT Press, 1999)
 Issues and Agents in International Political Economy: An International Organization Reader, ed. by Benjamin J. Cohen and Charles Lipson (Cambridge, MA: MIT Press, 1999)

Editorials
Lipson has contributed editorials to the Chicago Tribune.

Media appearances
In 2013, Lipson frequently appeared as a guest on Beyond the Beltway with Bruce DuMont, a nationally syndicated radio show that provides listeners with weekly political discussions. He also appeared on Pritzker Military Presents Front & Center in 2004.

Awards
In 2011, Lipson received the Quantrell Award for Excellence in Undergraduate Teaching from the University of Chicago.

References

Living people
1948 births
People from Quitman County, Mississippi
University of Chicago faculty
American political scientists
Harvard University alumni
Yale College alumni